The 1973–74 NBA season was the Detroit Pistons' 26th season in the NBA and 17th season in the city of Detroit.  The team played at Cobo Arena in downtown Detroit.  

The Pistons finished with a 52-30 (.634) record, 3rd place in the Midwest Division, only their second winning season since moving to Detroit in 1957.  The team was led by guard Dave Bing (18.8 ppg, 6.9 apg, NBA All-Star) and center Bob Lanier (22.5 ppg, 13.3 rpg, NBA All-Star and NBA All-Star Game MVP).  Pistons coach Ray Scott was recognized as the NBA Coach of the Year, the first black coach in the league to win the award.  It wouldn't be until 1991 when Don Chaney won the award that another black coach was so honored.    

Detroit advanced to the 1974 NBA Playoffs, the team's first playoff appearance since the 1967-68 Detroit Pistons season, losing the Western Conference semi-finals 4-3 to the Chicago Bulls, dropping the deciding 7th game 96-94 in Chicago.  In the 7th game at Chicago Stadium, after a furious Detroit rally, Dennis Awtrey of the Bulls tipped an inbounds pass by Bing with 3 seconds remaining and Norm Van Lier dribbled out the clock to preserve the Chicago victory.

Draft picks

Roster

Regular season

Season standings

Record vs. opponents

Game log

Playoffs

|- align="center" bgcolor="#ccffcc"
| 1
| March 30
| @ Chicago
| W 97–88
| Bob Lanier (27)
| Lanier, Rowe (13)
| Don Adams (6)
| Chicago Stadium10,711
| 1–0
|- align="center" bgcolor="#ffcccc"
| 2
| April 1
| Chicago
| L 103–108
| Bob Lanier (38)
| Bob Lanier (19)
| Dave Bing (7)
| Cobo Arena11,499
| 1–1
|- align="center" bgcolor="#ffcccc"
| 3
| April 5
| @ Chicago
| L 83–84
| Dave Bing (23)
| Bob Lanier (16)
| Lanier, Rowe (2)
| Chicago Stadium17,634
| 1–2
|- align="center" bgcolor="#ccffcc"
| 4
| April 7
| Chicago
| W 102–87
| Bob Lanier (26)
| Bob Lanier (18)
| Dave Bing (8)
| Cobo Arena11,287
| 2–2
|- align="center" bgcolor="#ffcccc"
| 5
| April 9
| @ Chicago
| L 94–98
| Bob Lanier (23)
| Bob Lanier (17)
| Dave Bing (6)
| Chicago Stadium14,236
| 2–3
|- align="center" bgcolor="#ccffcc"
| 6
| April 11
| Chicago
| W 92–88
| Bob Lanier (28)
| Bob Lanier (14)
| Dave Bing (10)
| Cobo Arena11,134
| 3–3
|- align="center" bgcolor="#ffcccc"
| 7
| April 13
| @ Chicago
| L 94–96
| Stu Lantz (25)
| Lanier, Rowe (10)
| Stu Lantz (5)
| Chicago Stadium13,133
| 3–4
|-

Player stats

Season

Awards and records
Ray Scott, NBA Coach of the Year Award
Dave Bing, All-NBA Second Team

See also
 1974 in Michigan

References

Detroit
Detroit Pistons seasons
Detroit Pistons
Detroit Pistons